Burning Palms is an unbounded neighbourhood within the locality of Lilyvale and a beach in the Royal National Park, Wollongong, south of Sydney, New South Wales, Australia. It has a surf club and a local cabin community, and is a popular day-walk destination, along with the 'figure-8' rock pools on the rock shelf to the beach's south.

It is accessed via a very steep, moderately difficult walk down (and up) the mountain through forest and grass plains. It is located in the area known as the Garawarra.

Together with Little Garie and Era, the neighbourhood was added to the New South Wales State Heritage Register on 27 April 2012 as part of the Royal National Park Coastal Cabin Communities.

Notes

Localities in New South Wales
Beaches of New South Wales
Lilyvale, New South Wales